Speedo may refer to:

Speedo International Limited, a swimsuit manufacturer
Swim briefs, sometimes referred to as "Speedos" regardless of the manufacturer
Bitstream Speedo Fonts, a typeface
"Speedoo", 1955 song recorded by The Cadillacs, also known as "Speedo"
Earl Carroll (vocalist) (1937–2012), also known as "Speedo"
Gary Speed (1969–2011), Welsh footballer and manager, nicknamed "Speedo"
Ryan Speedo Green (born 1986), American bass-baritone opera singer
Mackerel scad, a wide-ranging species of scad

See also
Speedometer, the speed gauge in motor vehicles